Satsop is a census-designated place (CDP) in Grays Harbor County, Washington, United States. The population was 675 at the 2010 census, up from 619 at the 2000 census.

Geography
Satsop is located in southeastern Grays Harbor County on the Satsop River, at  (47.005733, -123.471254). U.S. Route 12 runs along the southern edge of the community, leading west  to Aberdeen and southeast  to Grand Mound.

Demographics
As of the census of 2000, there were 619 people, 228 households, and 166 families residing in the CDP. The population density was 88.6 people per square mile (34.2/km2). There were 258 housing units at an average density of 36.9/sq mi (14.3/km2). The racial makeup of the CDP was 94.67% White, 1.13% African American, 1.13% Native American, 1.94% Asian, 0.81% from other races, and 0.32% from two or more races. Hispanic or Latino of any race were 1.78% of the population.

There were 228 households, out of which 33.3% had children under the age of 18 living with them, 57.9% were married couples living together, 11.4% had a female householder with no husband present, and 26.8% were non-families. 22.4% of all households were made up of individuals, and 12.3% had someone living alone who was 65 years of age or older. The average household size was 2.71 and the average family size was 3.13.

In the CDP, the population was spread out, with 28.6% under the age of 18, 7.1% from 18 to 24, 25.7% from 25 to 44, 24.6% from 45 to 64, and 14.1% who were 65 years of age or older. The median age was 38 years. For every 100 females, there were 101.6 males. For every 100 females age 18 and over, there were 100.9 males.

The median income for a household in the CDP was $37,125, and the median income for a family was $43,125. Males had a median income of $31,000 versus $18,750 for females. The per capita income for the CDP was $14,245. About 9.5% of families and 16.8% of the population were below the poverty line, including 30.9% of those under age 18 and 5.8% of those age 65 or over.

Landmarks 
Satsop is the site of the planned Satsop Nuclear Power Plant, designed to house two 1,250-megawatt pressurized water reactors. Construction of the Satsop Nuclear Power Plant began in 1977 and was halted in 1983 after a $61 million budget shortfall, leaving the plant 75% complete. The twin cooling towers that are part of the unfinished plant are a well-known landmark in the area.

References

External links
 Can Unused A-Plant Become a Princess?
 Invasion Of The Longhairs: First Legal Rock Festival

Census-designated places in Grays Harbor County, Washington
Census-designated places in Washington (state)